The 2017–18 Volvo Ocean Race was the 13th edition of the round-the-world Volvo Ocean Race. It started in Alicante, Spain, and concluded in The Hague, Netherlands. GAC Pindar provides logistic support for the race. At the stopovers, teams had premium bases for better fan interaction.

Volvo made a number of changes to this edition. Sailors were able to provide social media updates, new male/female ratios were introduced, Onboard Reporters rotated between teams, a new scoring system was used, the yachts were upgraded with Hydro generators for back-up power and all teams sailed the 2017 Fastnet Race.

During Leg 7 of the race, John Fisher, 47, a British citizen who lived in Adelaide, was swept overboard from Sun Hung Kai/Scallywag and lost at sea 1400 miles west of Cape Horn.

Yachts

For the second edition running, the race was one-design, racing the Volvo Ocean 65. The VO65 was designed by Farr Yacht Design to be a cheaper and safer alternative to the ageing and expensive Volvo Open 70.

All Volvo 65's have undergone repairs and refits by The Boatyard. This ensured that all the yachts are the same. The estimated cost of the refit was 1 million euros per boat.

Participants
Despite an eighth boat being produced for this edition, only seven teams participated, as in the previous edition:

 — Skipper Simeon Tienpont was released from Team AkzoNobel on 13 October, one day before the first in-port race, and replaced by Brad Jackson. Two hours before the start of leg 1, Tienpont was re-instated by an arbitration panel.

Route
The full route for this edition was announced in June 2016, with the announcement of the addition of Melbourne in January 2017.

This edition of the race included "Leg 0", a set of 4 offshore races to help generate interest. They included the 2017 Round the Island Race, and the 2017 Fastnet Race.

Notes (134 sailing days for race winners and 10 In-port racing days):

Results

As opposed to the previous edition, scoring was based on a high-points system, with the winner of every leg scoring one bonus point (7+1 bonus point for a win, 6 for second, 5 for third, etc.). The two Southern Ocean legs – from Cape Town to Melbourne, and Auckland to Itajaí, plus the North Atlantic leg near the end of the race, Newport to Cardiff – all scored double points. There was a bonus point for the first team to round Cape Horn in a nod to the historic significance of this turning point in the race. A further bonus point was awarded for the team with the best total elapsed time overall in the race. The In-Port Series didn't count in the overall points but remained the tiebreaker should teams be tied on points at the finish in The Hague.

Overall Leg standings

 — Retired from leg after damage sustained from collision with commercial fishing vessel approximately 30 miles from the finish in Hong Kong. The collision resulted in the loss of the fishing vessel and the fatality of one of the crew members several hours later in a local hospital. Vestas 11th Hour Racing issued a Mayday distress call on behalf of the other vessel and undertook a search and rescue mission immediately following the incident.
 — 1 point for leg win, 1 point for elapsed time.
 — 3 points for leg win, 1 point for first around Cape Horn.

In-port series

Overall Results

References

External links

The Ocean Race
2017 in sailing
2018 in sailing
2017 in Spanish sport
2017 in Portuguese sport
2017 in South African sport
2017 in Australian sport
2018 in Australian sport
2018 in Chinese sport
2018 in New Zealand sport
2018 in Brazilian sport
2018 in American sports
2018 in Welsh sport
2018 in Swedish sport
2018 in Dutch sport
Sports competitions in Cardiff